

See also
Korean Buddhist temples
Korean Buddhism

References

  Jogye Order Official site
  http://koreatemple.net/
  http://www.amita.net/webdir/main.php
  Jogye Order of Korean Buddhism
 http://eng.templestay.com/

 
Tourist attractions in Seoul
Lists of religious buildings and structures in South Korea
Seoul-related lists
Seoul